The Pankisi Gorge crisis was a spillover of the Second Chechen War, with military dimension in Georgia early in the 2000s. Georgia was pressured by Russia and the United States to repress the threats of Al-Qaeda in the Pankisi Gorge.

The ricin crisis 
There seems little reason for Abu Musab al-Zarqawi to move into Pankisi Gorge, which is remote from Middle Eastern operational environments. In the build-up to the Iraq War in early 2003, dozens of North Africans (mainly Algerians) were arrested in the United Kingdom, France and Spain on charges of preparing ricin and other chemical weapons. Colin Powell and others trumpeted the arrests as proof of the threat posed by the Zarqawi-Chechen-Pankisi ricin network, which has now been expanded to include the Ansar al-Islam of Kurdish northern Iraq.

French and British security officials were astounded by Powell's insistence on February 12, 2003, saying that "the ricin that is bouncing around Europe now originated in Iraq." With the Iraq invasion only weeks away, the source of the ricin threat moved from Georgia to Iraq.

Sergei Ivanov reported that the Spanish suspects had been trained in the Pankisi Gorge by Al-Qaeda terrorists and even claimed that Osama Bin Laden may have been hiding somewhere in the Akhmeta Municipality. There were also claims of several Al-Qaeda laboratories producing ricin. Those lacked any evidence however, as the production of ricin required large quantities of castor beans, which were not grown in Georgia.

U.S.-Georgian anti-terrorist operations 
On 28 April 2002 a small Georgian anti-terror unit lead by their U.S. commander ambushed a group of insurgents. It was falsely believed that prominent mujahid leader Ibn al-Khattab was among the dead, according to allegations that Omar Mohammed Ali Al Rammah reportedly witnessed him die in that incident. This was due to his real identity remaining a mystery until after his demise. The quick and violent nature of the operation reportedly sparked fear among Chechen militants in the area, who went into hiding.

By October 20, 2002, Georgia had netted about a dozen Arab militants.

The Georgians and the U.S. led a serious crackdown on the militants that littered the gorge, capturing an unknown number of combatants. On September 3, 2003, President Eduard Shevardnadze said that the Georgian security forces had established full control over the gorge. Georgia sent 1,000 police officers and security troops to the region late in October, setting up checkpoints and vowing to impose order.

Georgian officials also said they planned to build up the number of border troops near Chechnya and Ingushetia, another Russian republic. Russia accused Georgia of allowing Chechen fighters to raid across the border. On June 15, 2003, 15 more Chechen militants entered the area and took refuge in a two-story house. Georgian officials said that more than 30 militants were detained.

France cracked down on May 14, 2004, by arresting two Algerians working with chemical and biological weapons. Georgia announced the end of the operation and withdrew its Internal Troops from the region by January 21, 2005.

See also 
 2012 Lopota Gorge hostage crisis

References

Post-Soviet conflicts
Chechen–Russian conflict
Al-Qaeda activities
2001 in Georgia (country)
2002 in Georgia (country)
2003 in Georgia (country)
Operations involving Georgian special forces